The Parishes of Ecuador are the third-level administrative units of Ecuador. The Cantons of Ecuador are divided into parishes which are similar to municipalities or communes in many countries. There are over 1,500 parishes in Ecuador.

References

 Asociación de Gobiernos Parroquiales Rurales del Azuay